Thabit Abdi Mohamed is a Somali politician and diplomat. He is the former Mayor of Mogadishu and former Governor of Banaadir.  Prior to this post, he served as the Deputy Chief of Mission at the Embassy of the Federal Republic of Somalia in Washington DC. Mr. Mohamed served as the Acting Chief of Staff as well as Deputy Chief of Staff at the Office of the President in Somalia. He has also worked at the United Nations for the UN Development Program (UNDP).

References

Year of birth missing (living people)
Living people
21st-century Somalian politicians
20th-century Somalian people
People from Mogadishu
Mayors of Mogadishu